Viamala is a section of the river Hinterrhein in Switzerland.

Via Mala may refer to:

 Via Mala (novel), a 1934 Swiss novel by John Knittel
 Via Mala (1945 film), a German film adaptation directed by Josef von Báky
 Via Mala (1961 film), a German film adaptation directed by Paul May
 Via Mala (TV series), a television adaptation

See also 

 Viamala Region, a region of the Canton of Graubünden